Mikhail Svyatoslavovich Osinov (born 8 October 1975) is a Russian football coach and a former midfielder. He works as an assistant coach with FC Rostov.

Career
Born in Arti, Sverdlovsk Oblast, Mikhail Osinov started his professional career at the Gornyak Kachkanar in 1993. In 1994-1995, he played for Uralets Nizhny Tagil. Next year, Osinov was invited to Uralmash, the biggest club in the region.

After two seasons in Yekaterinburg, Osinov moved to Israel for a spell with Maccabi Tel Aviv. He later returned to the Russian Top Division side Rotor Volgograd.

In 2001, Osinov was transferred to FC Rostov and stayed there for 9 years, suffering a relegation and helping the yellow-blues to return to the Premier League. He also holds the club record for league appearances with 239 games.

In 2010, he returned to Yekaterinburg to play in the Russian First Division. In 2011, Osinov went to a lower league joining MITOS Novocherkassk of the Russian Second Division.

On 11 September 2011, in a league game against Olimpia Gelendzhik Osinov scored a goal that some sources consider the fastest in the history of the game, at 2.68 seconds from kickoff.

Honours
 2008 Russian First Division winner
 2002–03 Russian Cup runner-up
 2008 Russian First Division best player

Personal life
His son Mikhail is a professional footballer.

References

External links
 Russian Premier League profile 
 Russian Football Union profile 
 FC Rostov profile 

1975 births
Living people
People from Artinsky District
Russian footballers
Russia under-21 international footballers
Association football midfielders
FC Ural Yekaterinburg players
FC Rostov players
FC Rotor Volgograd players
Maccabi Tel Aviv F.C. players
Expatriate footballers in Israel
Russian expatriate footballers
Russian Premier League players
FC Uralets Nizhny Tagil players
Sportspeople from Sverdlovsk Oblast